Belgium sent a delegation to compete at the 2010 Winter Paralympics in Vancouver, British Columbia, Canada from 12–21 March 2010. The country was represented by a single athlete, visually impaired Natasha de Troyer, who competed in five events in alpine skiing.

Alpine skiing 

Natasha de Troyer was her country's sole representative, skiing with her guide Diego Van de Voorde. She has said that she is aiming for three medals. She  competed in all five events in alpine skiing: downhill, Super-G, giant slalom, slalom and 
super combined.

See also
 Belgium at the Paralympics
 Belgium at the 2010 Winter Olympics

References

External links
Vancouver 2010 Paralympic Games official website
International Paralympic Committee official website

Nations at the 2010 Winter Paralympics
2010
Paralympics